The 1992 Pepsi 400 was the 15th stock car race of the 1992 NASCAR Winston Cup Series season and the 34th iteration of the event. The race was held on Saturday, July 4, 1992, before an audience of 80,000 in Daytona Beach, Florida at Daytona International Speedway, a 2.5 miles (4.0 km) permanent triangular-shaped superspeedway. The race took the scheduled 160 laps to complete. At race's end, Morgan–McClure Motorsports driver Ernie Irvan would manage to dominate the majority of the race to take his fifth career NASCAR Winston Cup Series victory and his second victory of the season. To fill out the top three, Junior Johnson & Associates driver Sterling Marlin and Joe Gibbs Racing driver Dale Jarrett would finish second and third, respectively.

Background 

Daytona International Speedway is one of three superspeedways to hold NASCAR races, the other two being Indianapolis Motor Speedway and Talladega Superspeedway. The standard track at Daytona International Speedway is a four-turn superspeedway that is 2.5 miles (4.0 km) long. The track's turns are banked at 31 degrees, while the front stretch, the location of the finish line, is banked at 18 degrees.

Entry list 

 (R) denotes rookie driver.

Qualifying 
Qualifying was split into two rounds. The first round was held on Thursday, July 2, at 2:30 PM EST. Each driver would have one lap to set a time. During the first round, the top 20 drivers in the round would be guaranteed a starting spot in the race. If a driver was not able to guarantee a spot in the first round, they had the option to scrub their time from the first round and try and run a faster lap time in a second round qualifying run, held on Friday, July 3, at 1:30 PM EST. As with the first round, each driver would have one lap to set a time. For this specific race, positions 21-40 would be decided on time, and depending on who needed it, a select amount of positions were given to cars who had not otherwise qualified but were high enough in owner's points; up to two provisionals were given. If needed, a past champion who did not qualify on either time or provisionals could use a champion's provisional, adding one more spot to the field.

Three drivers would fail to qualify.

Full qualifying results

Race results

Standings after the race 

Drivers' Championship standings

Note: Only the first 10 positions are included for the driver standings.

References 

1992 NASCAR Winston Cup Series
NASCAR races at Daytona International Speedway
July 1992 sports events in the United States
1992 in sports in Florida